The 2005 European Judo Open Championships were the 2nd edition of the European Judo Open Championships, and were held in Moscow, Russia on 3 December 2005.

The European Judo Open Championships was staged because the open class event had been dropped from the European Judo Championships program from 2004. Unlike the regular European Judo Championships, several competitors from each country are allowed to enter.

Results

References

External links
 

European
Judo Championships
European Judo Open Championships
International sports competitions hosted by Russia
Sports competitions in Moscow
European Judo Open Championships
European Judo Open Championships
Judo competitions in Russia